Automat is the first compilation album by Canadian noise rock band METZ. It was released on July 12, 2019 through Sub Pop Records, and is composed of non-album singles, b-sides, rarities, and previously unreleased work recorded from 2009 to 2015.

Automat was met with generally favorable reviews from music critics. At Metacritic, which assigns a normalized rating out of 100 to reviews from mainstream publications, the album received an average score of 72 based on seven reviews. The aggregator AnyDecentMusic? has the critical consensus of the album at a 6.8 out of 10, based on seven reviews.

Track listing 

Notes
Tracks 1-6 were recorded and mixed at Halla Music and Giant Studios in Toronto during 2009-10, originally released via We Are Busy Bodies
Track 7 was recorded in 2011 and originally released via Deadstock/Castor Design
Tracks 8-10 were recorded and mixed at the Dream House in Toronto during 2012-13, originally released via Sub Pop Records
Tracks 11-12 were recorded and mixed at Union Sound Company in Toronto in 2015, originally released via Three One G

Charts

References

External links

Metz (band) albums
2019 compilation albums
Sub Pop compilation albums